Melancholy Beast is the debut studio album by the Danish power metal band Pyramaze, released by Nightmare Records and Massacre Records in May 2004.

Track listing 
 "Sleepy Hollow" − 6:11
 "Forsaken Kingdom" − 5:27
 "Melancholy Beast" − 6:11
 "The Journey" − 5:47
 "Until We Fade Away" − 4:36
 "Legend" − 7:11
 "Mighty Abyss" − 8:03
 "The Nature of Triumph" − 0:50
 "Power of Imagination" − 6:29
 "The Wizard" − 4:38 (Japanese bonus track)

Credits

Band members 
 Lance King − vocals
 Michael Kammeyer − guitars
 Jonah Weingarten − keyboards
 Morten Gade Sørensen − drums
 Niels Kvist − bass

Songwriting 
 Lyrics and music written and composed by Michael Kammeyer
 "The Nature of Triumph" written by Jonah Weingarten

Production and other 
 Mixed at Hansen Studios
 Mastered at Hansen Studios
 Produced and mixed by Jacob Hansen
 Mastered by Jacob Hansen (www.jacobhansen.com)
 Artwork by Rob Alexander (www.robalexander.com)
 Layout by Claus Jensen (www.intromental.com/design)

External links 
 Pyramaze homepage
 Nightmare Records Inc.

Pyramaze albums
2004 debut albums
Massacre Records albums
Albums produced by Jacob Hansen